The 2021 Bolivian Primera División season, known as the 2021 Copa Tigo season for sponsorship reasons, was the 44th season of the División Profesional del Fútbol Boliviano, Bolivia's top-flight football league and the fourth season under División de Fútbol Profesional management. The season began on 9 March and ended on 12 December 2021.

Independiente Petrolero won their first title in the tournament following a 3–2 win over Guabirá and a 1–0 loss for The Strongest against Real Santa Cruz on the last day of the season. Always Ready were the defending champions, having won the 2020 Apertura tournament.

Format
The format for the 2021 season was approved by the 16 División Profesional clubs on 17 February 2021. Given the need to allow clubs qualified for the Copa Libertadores and Copa Sudamericana as well as the national team to fulfill their international commitments, and concerns by the development of the COVID-19 pandemic, it was decided to play a single tournament in the year instead of the usual Apertura and Clausura system. The 16 teams played each other twice in a double round-robin tournament for a total of 30 rounds. The Bolivian Football Federation originally proposed 13 March 2021 as the date to start the competition, but per request from the four clubs that took part in the Copa Sudamericana the date was moved forward to 10 March 2021. The top four clubs at the end of the season qualified for the 2022 Copa Libertadores, with the champions and runners-up entering the group stage, while the next four best-placed teams qualified for the 2022 Copa Sudamericana.

Teams
16 teams competed in the league for the 2021 season, increasing from 14 since no clubs were relegated at the end of the previous season. Real Tomayapo and Independiente Petrolero, the 2020 Copa Simón Bolívar champions and runners-up, were both promoted for this season. The former competed for the first time in the top tier, while the latter returned after a 17-year absence.

Stadia and locations

Managerial changes

Notes

Standings

Results

Top scorers

Source: Soccerway

Relegation/promotion play-off
The relegation play-off was played by:
 Real Potosí (2021 División Profesional 15th place)
 Universitario de Sucre (2021 Copa Simón Bolívar runners-up)

The winners will play in the top flight for the 2022 season.

Universitario de Sucre won 6–0 on points and were promoted to Primera División.

References

External links
 División Profesional on the FBF's official website 

2021
P
Bolivia